Nyole (also LoNyole, Lunyole, Nyuli) is a Bantu language spoken by the Banyole in  Butaleja District, Uganda. There is 61% lexical similarity with a related but different Nyole language in Kenya.

Phonology

Consonants

Nyole has series of voiceless, voiced, and prenasalized stops.  is labio-velar.

Vowels

Historical changes

Nyole has an interesting development from Proto-Bantu *p → Nyole . Schadeberg (1989) connects this sound change to rhinoglottophilia, where the sound change developed first as  →  → . The velar place of articulation development is due to velar nasals being the least perceptible of the nasals and its marginal status in (pre-)Nyole and other Bantu languages.

 n-ŋuliira ("hear" stem form) : puliira "I hear"
 n-ŋumula ("rest" stem form) : pumula "I rest"

In other forms (like  "to hear" and  "to rest"), the original stem-initial  can be seen.

Writing System

See also
 Luhya language

References

 Eastman, Carol M. (1972). Lunyole of the Bamenya, JAL, 11 (3), 63-78.
 Morris, H. F. (1963). A note on Lunyole. Uganda Journal, 27, 127-134.
 Schadeberg, Thilo C. (1989). The velar nasal in Nyole (E. 35). Annales Aequatoria, 10, 169-179. (Available online).

Languages of Uganda
Luhya language